Njalla is an anonymous domain name registrar, hosting provider and VPN provider, established by The Pirate Bay founder Peter Sunde.

History 
Peter Sunde started the company in 2017 as a middle man between domain registration and registrants in order to provide anonymity.

In 2020, RIAA and MPA flagged Njalla as well as CDNs, apps (such as Telegram), hosting providers and advertisers that worked with piracy sites to be blacklisted by US government.

References

External links 
 

Domain name registrars
Tor onion services
Virtual private network services